Teahna Daniels (born March 25, 1997) is an American athlete competing in sprinting events. Representing the United States at the 2019 World Athletics Championships, she placed seventh in the women's 100 metres.

She led off the American 4 × 100 meters relay team at the 2014 World Junior Championships in Athletics and 2015 Pan American Junior Athletics Championships to win gold medals and also won an individual 100 m bronze medal at the Pan American Junior Championships.

Collegiately, she ran track for the Texas Longhorns and placed third in the 100 m at the 2017 NCAA Outdoor Championships and was a 100 m and 200 m finalist at the 2019 NCAA Outdoor Championships. She won the 100 m title at the 2019 NACAC U18 and U23 Championships in Athletics in July.

Daniels made her first national podium at the 2018 USA Track & Field Indoor Championships, taking third place in the 60-meter dash. She won her first national title at the 2019 USA Outdoor Track and Field Championships with a surprise victory in the 100 m over Olympic gold medallists English Gardner and Morolake Akinosun.

Professional
Daniels became a certified yoga teacher in 2020 and she started to create designer clothes in 2021.

Daniels is a 4-time USA champion. She specializes in the 60 meters, 100 meters, 200 meters & 4x100 meters.

NCAA
Teahna Daniels is a 2016 NCAA Division 1 60 m Champion, 10-time NCAA All-American, and 7-time Big 12 individual event champion as a student-athlete at University of Texas at Austin.

National titles
USA Outdoor Track and Field Championships
100 m: 2019

See also
List of 100 metres national champions (women)
United States at the 2019 World Athletics Championships

References

External links

25 August 2021 Track Girl Summer conversation with Teahna Daniels
Teahna Daniels profile Texas Longhorns

1997 births
Living people
American female sprinters
Texas Longhorns women's track and field athletes
World Athletics Championships athletes for the United States
World Athletics Championships medalists
USA Outdoor Track and Field Championships winners
Athletes (track and field) at the 2020 Summer Olympics
Medalists at the 2020 Summer Olympics
Olympic silver medalists for the United States in track and field
Olympic female sprinters
American yoga teachers